Kian Pemberton is a West Indian cricketer. He made his first-class debut for the Leeward Islands in the 2018–19 Regional Four Day Competition on 28 February 2019. Prior to his first-class debut, he was named in the West Indies' squad for the 2018 Under-19 Cricket World Cup.

References

External links
 

Year of birth missing (living people)
Living people
Leeward Islands cricketers
Place of birth missing (living people)